Walter Thomas Laidlaw (24 July 1891 – 18 February 1981) was an Australian rules footballer who played with South Melbourne in the Victorian Football League (VFL).

Notes

External links 

1891 births
1981 deaths
Australian rules footballers from Melbourne
Sydney Swans players
People from Footscray, Victoria